Bonnier may refer to:

 Bonnier Group, a privately held Swedish media group
 Bonnier family, a Swedish family related to the conglomerate
 Bonnier (surname)
 Bunder, a unit of area